Robert Goodwin  may refer to:

 Robert Goodwin (Roundhead) (c. 1601 – 1681), English politician who sat in the House of Commons at various times between 1626 and 1659
 Robert K. Goodwin (1905–1983), Republican U.S. Representative from March 1940 until 1941
 R. W. Goodwin, American television producer and director best known for his work as senior executive producer of The X-Files
 R. Booth Goodwin, (born 1971), known commonly as Booth Goodwin is the United States Attorney for the Southern District of West Virginia
 Robert Goodwin (wrestler) (born 1981), American professional wrestler
 A man who was shot and killed in a killing streamed to Facebook in April 2017

See also

Robert Godwin (disambiguation)